The final tournament was held in Italy and Bulgaria from 9 to 30 September 2018.

Poland defended their world title, defeating the reigning Olympic champions Brazil in straight sets at a repeat of the 2014 final. United States won the 3rd place match, defeating Serbia in four sets.

Tournament statistics

Attendance
 Matches played : 94
 Attendance (first round) (played 60) : 190,213 (3,170 per match)
 Attendance (second round) (played 24) : 90,124 (3,755 per match)
 Attendance (third round) (played 6) : 61,361 (10,227 per match)
 Attendance (final round) (played 4) : 47,331 (11,833 per match)
 Total attendance on tournament : 389,029 (4,139 per match)
 Most attendance : 12,875 -  v. , Forum di Assago, Milan on 22 September 2018.
 Fewest attendance : 230 -  v. , Palace of Culture and Sports, Varna on 17 September 2018.

Matches
 Most matches wins : 10 - , 
 Most points played in match : 230 -  vs.  3 : 2 (116/114)
 Fewest points played in match : 116 -  vs.  0 : 3 (41/75)
 Longest match played (duration) : 149 min. -  vs.  (2h,29m)
 Shortest match played (duration) : 72 min. -  vs.  (1h,12m)

Sets
 Total sets (first round)  : 226 (3.77 per match)
 Total sets (second round)  : 91 (3.79 per match)
 Total sets (third round)  : 22 (3.67 per match)
 Total sets (final round)  : 15 (3.75 per match)
 Total sets  scored : 353 (3.76 per match)
 Most sets played : 46 - 
 Most sets wins : 32 - , 
 Fewest sets wins : 1 - 
 Most sets lost : 21 - , 
 Fewest sets lost : 11 - , 
 Highest set ratio : 2.462 -  (32/13)
 Lowest set ratio : 0.067 -  (1/15)

Points
 Total points (first round)  : 9,882 (165 per match)
 Total points (second round)  : 3,979 (166 per match)
 Total points (third round)  : 967 (161 per match)
 Total points (final round)  : 694 (174 per match)
 Total points scored  : 15,522 (165 per match)
 Most points wins : 1,068 - 
 Fewest points wins : 267 - 
 Most points lost : 991 - 
 Fewest points lost : 398 - , 
 Highest points ratio : 1.141 -  (1068/936)
 Lowest points ratio : 0.671 -  (267/398)

Squads

Coaches
 Oldest coach: Antonio Giacobbe  - 71 years and 212 days in the first game against Brazil.
 Youngest coach: Tuomas Sammelvuo  - 42 years and 206 days in the first game against Bulgaria.
Teams with foreign coaches: 7 teams are trained by foreign coaches, including two teams (Dominican Republic and Iran) of coaches whose home countries (Venezuela and Montenegro) did not qualify for the 2018 FIVB Volleyball Men's World Championship.

Players
 Appearance record: Luciano de Cecco , Nathan Roberts, Paul Carroll , Teodor Salparov , Ahmed Abdelhay  and Marko Podraščanin  participated in the World Championship for the fourth time.
 Oldest player: At 39 years and 130 days, Jean Patrice Ndaki Mboulet  is the oldest player ever to be nominated for a 2018 FIVB Volleyball Men's World Championship finals.
 Youngest player: Marlon Yang  is the youngest player at the age of 17 years and 111 days.
 Tallest player: At 2.18 m (7 ft 2 in), Dmitry Muserskiy  is the tallest player ever to be nominated for a 2018 FIVB Volleyball Men's World Championship finals.
 Shortest player: At 1.70 m (5 ft 7 in), Taichiro Koga  is the shortest player ever to be nominated for a 2018 FIVB Volleyball Men's World Championship finals.
 21 teams nominated at least one player from the domestic league, Cameroon, Bulgaria, Japan and Puerto Rico nominated at least one player who is free agent, but only China, Cuba, Dominican Republic, Egypt, Italy, Japan, Puerto Rico and Russia exclusively fielded players of its own domestic league. By contrast, Australia, Canada and Netherlands nominated only players from foreign leagues.
 The most players (51) are active in clubs based in Italy, the majority of them in the SuperLega. In total 15 of the 24 team squads have players who play in England.
 From the leagues of countries that did not qualify for the World Cup, the Germany Bundesliga have the strongest representation with 12 players.

Multiple World Championships

Final standing
 Champions   Runners up   Third place   Fourth place

|- 
|colspan=12| Teams eliminated in third round

|- 
|colspan=12| Teams eliminated in second round

|- 
|colspan=12| Teams eliminated in first round

|}
Source: WCH 2018 final standings

Statistics leaders

Awards

Most Valuable Player
 Bartosz Kurek
Best Setter
 Micah Christenson
Best Outside Spikers
 Michał Kubiak
 Douglas Souza

Best Middle Blockers
 Lucas Saatkamp
 Piotr Nowakowski
Best Opposite Spiker
 Matt Anderson
Best Libero
 Paweł Zatorski

See also

2018 FIVB Volleyball Women's World Championship statistics
FIVB Volleyball Men's Nations League statistics
FIVB Volleyball Women's Nations League statistics
Volleyball records and statistics
Major achievements in volleyball by nation
List of Indoor Volleyball World Medalists

References

External links
Fédération Internationale de Volleyball – official website
2018 Men's World Championship – official website
Competition formula
Teams
History
Honours
Previous Edition

statistics
Volleyball records and statistics